Njivice is a village located on the island of Krk in Primorje-Gorski Kotar County, Croatia. According to the 2011 census, the village has a population of 1,115. It is located in the Omišalj municipality, 6 km south of Omišalj itself.

Geography 

The village is located on the north-west coast of the island of Krk.

History 

The first documentary mention of Njivice is found in a deed of donation of Count Ivan Frankopan drawn up in 1474. At that time it was a small fishing village, whereas nowadays the community is mostly known for tourism. Expansion as a tourist resort began in 1930, with the construction of Hotel Luka (today Hotel Jadran). Since the eighties the new housing estate of Kijac has also formed part of the village.

Traffic 

The D102 state road, running from the north of the island to the south, skirts the east of the village, connecting it with larger centres on Krk such as Omišalj, Malinska, Krk, Punat and Baška. The nearby Krk Bridge connects Njivice with the city of Rijeka on the mainland, via the D8 state road. Rijeka Airport is situated to the north, near Omišalj. The nearest train station is located in Rijeka.

Tourism 

Besides the construction of the hotel Luka (today Jadran), the villa Dinka has also played a part in the beginnings of tourism in Njivice. Visitors are attracted by the beautiful beaches, an extraordinary blue sea, a lot of shaded places and a pleasant climate paired with plentiful accommodation. Njivice is getting greater recognition year by year.

Sports 

Njivice has a Boules club, the "Trstena".

Gallery

References

External links 

 Official site of the tourist board Njivice‑Omišalj

Populated places in Primorje-Gorski Kotar County